The Limping Devil  is one of the most popular works by Luis Vélez de Guevara; it is his only novel published in 1641. In 1918 an edition published by Francisco Rodríguez Marín became well known. The story is about a student that takes the devil out of a flask where a magician had locked him. The devil, grateful, shows the student the interior of houses (as if they were toys). This way, they are able to contemplate its inhabitants in their privacy.

English translations 
 The Limping Devil - El Diablo Cojuelo - Bilingual Edition. Stockcero, 2018.

See also 
Spanish science fiction

References

1641 books
1640s novels
Spanish novels
Spanish satirical novels
Picaresque novels